Saw Township is a township of Pakokku District in the Magway Region of Burma (Myanmar).  The principal town and administrative seat is Saw.

Communities
Kyauktu (Kyaukhtu) is the second largest town in Saw Township.

Notes

External links
 Township 112 on "Myanmar States/Divisions & Townships Overview Map" Myanmar Information Management Unit (MIMU)
 "Saw Google Satellite Map" Maplandia 

Townships of Magway Region